Valentić is a surname. Notable people with the surname include:
 
Azrudin Valentić, Bosnian footballer and manager
Adrian Valentić (born 1987), footballer
Branka Valentić (born 1968), journalist
Nikica Valentić (born 1950), Croatian politician
Nikola Valentić (born 1983), Serbian footballer

Croatian surnames